Quang Bình  is a rural district of Hà Giang province in the Northeast region of Vietnam. As of 2019 the district had a population of 
61 711. The district covers an area of 774 km². The district capital is Yên Bình.

References

Districts of Hà Giang province
Hà Giang province